Diocese of Korea may refer to one of the following:
 Diocese of Korea (Anglican Church)
 Diocese of Korea (Roman Catholic)
 List of Catholic dioceses in Korea
 Diocese of Korea (Russian Orthodox Church)